Hector Edwards (born 18 March 1949) is a Barbadian former cyclist. He competed at the 1972 Summer Olympics and the 1976 Summer Olympics.

References

External links
 

1949 births
Living people
Barbadian male cyclists
Commonwealth Games competitors for Barbados
Cyclists at the 1970 British Commonwealth Games
Cyclists at the 1978 Commonwealth Games
Olympic cyclists of Barbados
Cyclists at the 1972 Summer Olympics
Cyclists at the 1976 Summer Olympics
Place of birth missing (living people)